Dhandera Rajputana is a census town in Haridwar district in the state of Uttarakhand, India.

About
 India census, Dhandera had a population of 15,297. Males constitute 52% of the population and females 48%. Dhandera has an average literacy rate of 55%, lower than the national average of 59.5%: male literacy is 62% and, female literacy is 48%. In Dhandera, 16% of the population is under 6 years of age.

Transport
Dhandhera railway station is situated on Moradabad–Ambala line under the Moradabad railway division

References

Cities and towns in Haridwar district